"Baby Jane" is a 1983 song by British singer Rod Stewart. It was a significant hit worldwide and remains his final UK number one single to date.

Background
Written by Rod Stewart and Jay Davis and produced by Stewart, Tom Dowd, George Cutko and Jim Cregan, the song was the lead single from his Body Wishes album and was his most successful single since "Da Ya Think I'm Sexy" in 1978.

Chart performance
"Baby Jane" peaked at No. 1 in the UK, remaining at the top of the chart for three weeks. In the US, the song was also a big hit, peaking at no. 14 on the Billboard Hot 100 chart. The single also charted highly in Australia, peaking at no. 10.

Weekly charts

Year-end charts

Certifications and sales

See also
List of European number-one hits of 1983
List of number-one hits of 1983 (Germany)
List of number-one singles of 1983 (Ireland)
List of number-one singles of 1983 (Spain)
List of UK Singles Chart number ones of the 1980s

References

External links
Rod Stewart - Baby Jane

1983 singles
1983 songs
European Hot 100 Singles number-one singles
Irish Singles Chart number-one singles
Music videos directed by Steve Barron
Number-one singles in Germany
Number-one singles in South Africa
Number-one singles in Spain
Rod Stewart songs
Songs written by Rod Stewart
UK Singles Chart number-one singles
Ultratop 50 Singles (Flanders) number-one singles
Song recordings produced by Tom Dowd
Warner Records singles